Acacia orthocarpa, also commonly known as Pilbara weeping wattle, needle-leaf wattle or straight-podded wattle, is a shrub or tree belonging to the genus Acacia and the subgenus Juliflorae that is endemic to tropical parts of northern Australia. The indigenous Nyangumarta peoples know it as yartupu.

Description
It has dark grey to grey-brown coloured bark that can be smooth or flaky. The brown, slightly angular branchlets are glabrous and have inconspicuous ridges and obvious lenticels. Like most species of Acacia it has phyllodes rather than true leaves. It flowers from March to April or June to July producing yellow flowers or sometimes as late as November and is thought to bloom at anytime following large scale rain events. After flowering woody and erect seed pods form that are usually linear to oblanceolate in shape and taper toward the base.

Taxonomy
The species was first formally described by the botanist Ferdinand von Mueller in 1859 as part of the work Contributiones ad Acaciarum Australiae Cognitionem as published in the Journal of the Proceedings of the Linnean Society, Botany. It was reclassified as Racosperma orthocarpum by Leslie Pedley in 1987 then transferred back to genus Acacia in 2001.
The specific epithet is taken from the Greek words ortho meaning straight and carpos meaning fruit in reference to the straight shape of the seed pods.

Distribution
It is native to central and northern parts of the Pilbara region including some of the islands in the Burrup Peninsula and the Dampier Archipelago as well as much of the Kimberley region of Western Australia and the range of the plant extends eastward into the southern part of top end and the central region of the Northern Territory and into Queensland to the Mount Isa, Galilee and Georgetown areas where it is found on rocky hills, along rocky creeks and on sandy flats growing in skeletal sandy or loamy soils as a part of savannah woodland and open Eucalyptus shrubland communities usually with an understorey of spinifex grasses.

See also
List of Acacia species

References

orthocarpa
Acacias of Western Australia
Flora of Queensland
Flora of the Northern Territory
Plants described in 1859
Taxa named by Ferdinand von Mueller